Yuki Bhambri was the defending champion but chose not to defend his title.

Henri Laaksonen won the title after defeating Jason Jung 6–3, 6–3 in the final.

Seeds

Draw

Finals

Top half

Bottom half

References
 Main Draw
 Qualifying Draw

Shanghai Challenger - Singles
2016 Singles
2016 in Chinese tennis